Tillandsia mitlaensis is a species of flowering plant in the genus Tillandsia. This species is endemic to Mexico.

Cultivars
 Tillandsia 'Anwyl Ecstasy'
 Tillandsia 'Anwyl Ecstasy #25'
 Tillandsia 'Jane Williams'

References

BSI Cultivar Registry Retrieved 11 October 2009

mitlaensis
Endemic flora of Mexico